Hargad fort is located in the Baglan area of Nashik district. There are two main hill ranges in Baglan area, the Selbari range is south of the Dolbari hill range. These two ranges run parallel to each other in east-west direction. Hargad is located on Selbari hill range. All these forts were maintained to keep watch on the Burhanpur-Surat ancient commercial road. The road passes between the two hill ranges. Hargad fort is a small fort, close to Mulher fort. These are key forts situated between fertile lands of Khandesh and port city of Surat.

History
No separate history is mentioned of this fort. This fort is adjoining the Mulher fort.

Places to see
There are few rock cut cisterns and caves on the fort, There is one 14 feet long cannon lying on the fort. There is no significant construction on the fort. The pathway to the fort is made of rock cut steps. From the top of this fort Mangi-Tungi, Salher, Salota, Mora, Mulher, Nhavigad forts are easily seen.

How to reach
There is a good motorable road up to the base village Mulher. It takes about two hour to reach the col between Mulher and Hargad fort. The path from the col leads to the fort. There are three gates in ruined condition. There is no good water on the fort, so it is advisable to carry enough water. It takes about one hour to climb and see the fort.

See also 
 List of forts in Maharashtra
 List of forts in India
 Marathi People
 List of Maratha dynasties and states
 Maratha War of Independence
 Battles involving the Maratha Empire
 Maratha Army
 Maratha titles
 Military history of India
 List of people involved in the Maratha Empire

References 

 Sangati written by Young zingaro Trekkers
 Sad sahyadrichi Bhatkanti Killyanchi written by P.K. Ghanekar

Buildings and structures of the Maratha Empire
Nashik district
16th-century forts in India
Buildings and structures in Maharashtra
Caves of Maharashtra
Tourist attractions in Pune district
Indian rock-cut architecture
Former populated places in India